Żery-Czubiki  is a village in the administrative district of Gmina Grodzisk, within Siemiatycze County, Podlaskie Voivodeship, in north-eastern Poland.

According to the 1921 census, the village was inhabited by 91 people, among whom 75 were Roman Catholic, 5 Orthodox, and 11 Mosaic. At the same time, all inhabitants declared Polish nationality. There were 18 residential buildings in the village.

References

Villages in Siemiatycze County